Old School is the barbershop quartet that won the International Quartet Championship for 2011 at the Barbershop Harmony Society's annual international convention, in Kansas City, Missouri.
The quartet had earned silver medals the two years before, losing to Crossroads and Storm Front respectively, before winning gold medals in front of future champions Musical Island Boys, Masterpiece, Main Street, Forefront, and After Hours.

References

External links
 Official website
 AIC entry

Barbershop Harmony Society
Barbershop quartets
Professional a cappella groups